Events in the year 1966 in the Republic of India.

Incumbents

Governors

Events
National income - 321,058 million

January - May 
 3 January – Prime Minister of India Lal Bahadur Shastri and President of Pakistan Ayub Khan agree to the Tashkent Declaration, a peace pact mediated by the Soviet Premier Alexei Kosygin in Tashkent, Uzbek S.S.R.
 11 January – Prime Minister Shastri dies of heart attack in Tashkent.
 19 January – Supported by provincial Congress chief ministers, Indira Gandhi becomes prime minister.
 24 January - Air India Flight 101 crashed into Mont Blanc killing the 117 passengers including Homi J. Bhabha who was in the flight. There was a similar aviation accident in the same spot in 1950.
 5 March - Indian Air Force bombs Aizawl following Mizo National Front uprising.
 28 March – Indira Gandhi visits Washington, D.C.

June - December 
 6 June - First Indira Gandhi ministry devalues Indian rupee by 57%.
 10 June - President of India promulgates Jayanti Shipping Company (Taking Over of Management) Ordinance, 1966 to take over shipping company owned by Jayanti Dharma Teja.
 19 June: Shiv Sena founded by Bal Thackeray.
 12 July – Indira Gandhi visits Moscow.
 7 November - 1966 anti-cow slaughter agitation and ensuing violence took place.
 17 November – Reita Faria, [Eve's Weekly Miss India] is crowned Miss World 1966, the first Indian to win the title.

Law
 27 August – Eighteenth Amendment of the Constitution of India takes effect.
 11 December – Nineteenth Amendment of the Constitution of India takes effect.
 22 December – Twentieth Amendment of the Constitution of India takes effect.
 29 December – Enactment of Seeds Act, creating central administration to oversee and certify seeds.

Sport
 Krishan Lal, (field hockey player) is awarded the Padma Shri.

Births
 3 January – Chetan Sharma, cricketer
 11 January – Sunil Kumar Mahato, politician, assassinated (d.2007).
 22 January - Kesineni Srinivas, politician and member of parliament from Vijayawada.
 28 January – Anjani Kumar, 1990 batch IPS officer
 24 March - Galla Jayadev, politician and member of parliament from Guntur.
30 March  Vikraman, film director.
 17 April – Vikram, actor.
 3 May – Firdous Bamji, actor.
 30 May – Rajinder Garg, politician.
 8 July  Revathi, actress.
 14 July – Sachin Puthran, entrepreneur.
 28 August – Priya Dutt, politician.
 1 September - Sonam Wangchuk, Indian engineer, innovator and education reformist.
24 October  Nadhiya, actress.
 30 October – K. V. Anand, cinematographer and film director (d. 2021)
 5 December – Dayanidhi Maran, politician.

Full date unknown
 Raj Kamal Jha, novelist and journalist.
 September – Faisal Khan, actor.

Deaths
 11 January – Lal Bahadur Shastri, politician and 2nd Prime Minister of India (b. 1904).
 Devarakonda Balagangadhara Tilak, poet, novelist and short story writer (b. 1921).
 24 January – Homi J. Bhabha, Indian nuclear physicist.
 26 February - Vinayak Damodar Savarkar, Indian Freedom Fighter (b. 1883).

See also 
 Bollywood films of 1966
 :Category:1966 establishments in India

References 

 
India
Years of the 20th century in India